The 1969 Queen's Club Championships, also known by its official name London Grass Court Championships, was a combined men's and women's tennis tournament played on grass courts at the Queen's Club in London in the United Kingdom. It was the 70th edition of the tournament and was held from 16 June through 21 June 1969. Fred Stolle and Ann Jones won the singles titles.

Finals

Men's singles

 Fred Stolle defeated  John Newcombe 6–3, 22–20
 It was Stolle's 1st title of the year and the 4th of his professional career.

Women's singles
 Ann Jones defeated  Winnie Shaw 6–0, 6–1

Men's doubles
 Owen Davidson /  Dennis Ralston defeated  Ove Nils Bengtson /  Thomaz Koch 7–5, 6–3
 It was Davidson's 2nd title of the year and the 2nd of his career. It was Ralston's only title of the year and the 2nd of his career.

Women's doubles
 Rosie Casals /  Billie-Jean King defeated  Françoise Dürr /  Ann Jones 8–6, 6–4

References

External links
 ATP tournament profile
 ITF tournament edition details

 
Queen's Club Championships
Queen's Club Championships
Queen's Club Championships
Queen's Club Championships
Queen's Club Championships